Vanessa Andrea Gonçalves Gomes (born February 10, 1986) is a yoga teacher, dentist, model and beauty pageant titleholder who was crowned Miss Venezuela 2010. She represented Venezuela at Miss Universe 2011 and placed in the Top 16.

Daughter of Portuguese emigrants, who currently lives in Miami, Florida.

Pageantry

Miss Venezuela 2010
Gonçalves, who stands , competed as Miss Miranda, one of 28 finalists in her country's national beauty pageant Miss Venezuela 2010, held on October 28, 2010, in Maracaibo, where she obtained the Best Body and Evening Gown awards and became the seventh Miss Venezuela winner from Miranda, gaining the right to represent her country in Miss Universe 2011.

Miss Universe 2011
As Miss Venezuela 2010, she went on to compete in Miss Universe 2011 on September 12, 2011, in Sao Paulo, Brazil and placed in the Top 16.

References

External links
Official Miss Venezuela website

1986 births
Living people
Miss Universe 2011 contestants
Miss Venezuela winners
People of Madeiran descent
Venezuelan people of Portuguese descent
Venezuelan beauty pageant winners
Universidad Santa María (Venezuela) alumni